The Pammakaristos Church, also known as the Church of Theotokos Pammakaristos ("All-Blessed Mother of God"), is one of the most famous Byzantine churches in Istanbul, Turkey, and was the last pre-Ottoman building to house the Ecumenical Patriarchate. Converted in 1591 into the Fethiye Mosque ("mosque of the conquest"), it is today partly a museum housed in a side chapel or parekklesion. One of the most important examples of Constantinople's Palaiologan architecture, the church contains the largest quantity of Byzantine mosaics in Istanbul after the Hagia Sophia and Chora Church.

The church-mosque is in the Çarşamba neighbourhood of the Fatih district inside the walled city of Istanbul.

History

Most scholars believe that the church was built between the eleventh and twelfth centuries. Many historians and archaeologists attribute the original structure to Michael VII Ducas (1071–1078); others put its foundation in the Comnenian period. Alternatively, the Swiss scholar and Byzantinist Ernest Mamboury suggested that the original building belonged to the 8th century. 

The parekklesion (side chapel) was added to the south side of the church in the early Palaiologan period, and dedicated to Christos ho Logos.  Shortly after 1310, Martha Glabas erected a small shrine in memory of her late husband, the protostrator Michael Doukas Glabas Tarchaneiote, a general of Andronikos II Palaiologos. An elegant dedicatory inscription to Christ, written by the poet Manuel Philes, runs along the inside and outside of the parekklesion.

The main church was also renovated at the same time, as the study of the Templon has shown.

Following the fall of Constantinople in 1453, the seat of the Greek Orthodox Patriarchate was first moved from Hagia Sophia to the Church of the Holy Apostles. Then in 1456 it was moved to the Theotokos Pammakaristos Church, where it remained until 1587.

Five years later, the Ottoman Sultan Murad III converted the church into a mosque and renamed it in honor of his conquest (fetih) of Georgia and Azerbaijan, hence the name Fethiye Camii. To accommodate the requirements of prayer, most of the interior walls were removed to create a larger inner space.

After years of neglect, the complex was restored in 1949 by the Byzantine Institute of America and Dumbarton Oaks. While the main building remains a mosque, the parekklesion has been a museum  since then.

In 2021 restoration work on the building began again. It was due to be completed by the end of 2022.

Architecture and decoration 
The Comnenian building was a church with a main aisle and two deambulatoria, three apses, and a narthex to the west. The masonry was typical of the Comnenian period, and used the recessed brick technique. In this technique, alternate courses of brick are mounted behind the line of the wall, and are plunged in a mortar's bed, which can still be seen in the cistern underneath and in the church.

The transformation of the church into a mosque greatly changed the original building. The arcades connecting the main aisle with the deambulatoria were removed and replaced with broad arches to open up the nave. The three apses were removed too. In their place towards the east a great domed room was built at an oblique angle to the orientation of the building.

On the other side, the parekklesion represents the most beautiful building of the late Byzantine period in Constantinople. It has the typical cross-in-square plan with five domes, but the proportion between vertical and horizontal dimensions is much bigger than usual (although not so big as in the contemporary Byzantine churches built in the Balkans).

Although the inner colored marble revetment largely disappeared, the shrine still contains the restored remains of a number of mosaic panels, which, while not as varied and well-preserved as those of the Chora Church, serve as another resource for understanding late Byzantine art.

A representation of the Pantocrator, surrounded by the prophets of the Old Testament (Moses, Jeremiah, Zephaniah, Micah, Joel, Zechariah, Obadiah, Habakkuk, Jonah, Malachi, Ezekiel, and Isaiah) fills the main dome. In the apse, Christ Hyperagathos is shown with the Virgin Mary and St. John the Baptist. A Baptism of Christ survives intact to the right side of the dome.

In the building with the Fethiye Museum (with an entrance in the street passing the garden where the entrance to the museum is) a part is still a mosque. Here are some pictures of its interior

See also
History of Roman and Byzantine domes

Notes

References

External links 

 Official website
 Byzantium 1200 | Pammakaristos Monastery
 130 pictures of the church
 Some more pictures of the mosque
History and Mosaics of the Pammakaristos

14th-century churches
Byzantine church buildings in Istanbul
Church buildings with domes
Museums in Istanbul
Byzantine art
Fatih
Ecumenical Patriarchate of Constantinople
Byzantine museums in Turkey